Vauzelles is a railway station in Varennes-Vauzelles, Bourgogne-Franche-Comté, France. The station is located on the Moret-Lyon railway. The station is served by regional trains (TER Bourgogne-Franche-Comté) towards Cosne-sur-Loire and Nevers.

References

Railway stations in Nièvre